The 2015–16 WHL season was the 50th season of the Western Hockey League (WHL). The regular season began on September 24, 2015, and ended with the Eastern Conference tiebreaker game on March 22, 2016.

The playoffs began shortly after the end of the regular season on March 24, 2016, and ended on May 13, 2016; the winning team, the Brandon Wheat Kings, was awarded the Ed Chynoweth Cup and a berth in the 2016 Memorial Cup that was be held at the ENMAX Centrium in Red Deer, Alberta May 19–29, 2016. The Red Deer Rebels qualified for the tournament as hosts.

Standings

Divisions: EA – East, CE – Central

x – Clinched Playoff spot, y – Clinched Division,  z - Clinched regular season title

bold – Clinched Playoff spot, y – Clinched Division, z - Clinched regular season title

Divisions: B.C. – B.C., US – U.S.

Eastern Conference Tiebreaker

Medicine Hat Tigers vs. Edmonton Oil Kings

Statistical leaders

Scoring leaders 

Players are listed by points, then goals.

Note: GP = Games played; G = Goals; A = Assists; Pts. = Points; PIM = Penalty minutes

Goaltenders 

These are the goaltenders that lead the league in GAA that have played at least 1380 minutes.

Note: GP = Games played; Mins = Minutes played; W = Wins; L = Losses; OTL = Overtime losses; SOL = Shootout losses; SO = Shutouts; GAA = Goals against average; Sv% = Save percentage

2016 WHL playoffs

Conference Quarter-finals

Eastern Conference

(E1) Brandon Wheat Kings vs. (W2) Edmonton Oil Kings

(E2) Prince Albert Raiders  vs. (E3) Moose Jaw Warriors

(C1) Lethbridge Hurricanes vs. (W1) Regina Pats

(C2) Red Deer Rebels vs (C3) Calgary Hitmen

Western Conference

(B1) Victoria Royals vs. (W2) Spokane Chiefs

(B2) Kelowna Rockets vs. (B3) Kamloops Blazers

(U1) Seattle Thunderbirds  vs. (W1) Prince George Cougars

(U2) Everett Silvertips vs. (U3) Portland Winterhawks

Conference Semi-finals

Eastern Conference

(E1) Brandon Wheat Kings vs (E3) Moose Jaw Warriors

(C2) Red Deer Rebels vs (W1) Regina Pats

Western Conference

(B1) Victoria Royals vs (B2) Kelowna Rockets

(U1) Seattle Thunderbirds vs (U2) Everett Silvertips

Conference Finals

Eastern Conference

(E1) Brandon Wheat Kings vs. (C2) Red Deer Rebels

Western Conference

(B2) Kelowna Rockets vs. (U1) Seattle Thunderbirds

WHL Championship

(E1) Brandon Wheat Kings vs. (U1) Seattle Thunderbirds

Playoff scoring leaders
Note: GP = Games played; G = Goals; A = Assists; Pts = Points; PIM = Penalty minutes

Playoff leading goaltenders
Note: GP = Games played; Mins = Minutes played; W = Wins; L = Losses; GA = Goals Allowed; SO = Shutouts; SV& = Save percentage; GAA = Goals against average

WHL awards

All-Star Teams

Eastern Conference

* - unanimous selection

Western Conference 

* - unanimous selection

See also 
 2016 Memorial Cup
 List of WHL seasons
 2015–16 OHL season
 2015–16 QMJHL season
 2015 in ice hockey
 2016 in ice hockey

References

External links 

Western Hockey League seasons
Whl
WHL